The 2015–16 UEFA Europa League play-off round began on 20 August and ended on 27 August 2015. A total of 44 teams competed in the play-off round to decide 22 of the 48 places in the group stage of the 2015–16 UEFA Europa League.

All times were CEST (UTC+2).

Round and draw dates
All draws were held at UEFA headquarters in Nyon, Switzerland.

Matches could also be played on Tuesdays or Wednesdays instead of the regular Thursdays due to scheduling conflicts.

Format
In the qualifying phase and play-off round, each tie was played over two legs, with each team playing one leg at home. The team that scored more goals on aggregate over the two legs advanced to the next round. If the aggregate score was level, the away goals rule was applied, i.e., the team that scored more goals away from home over the two legs advanced. If away goals were also equal, then thirty minutes of extra time was played, divided into two fifteen-minutes halves. The away goals rule was again applied after extra time, i.e., if there were goals scored during extra time and the aggregate score was still level, the visiting team advanced by virtue of more away goals scored. If no goals were scored during extra time, the tie was decided by penalty shoot-out.

In the draws for each round, teams were seeded based on their UEFA club coefficients at the beginning of the season, with the teams divided into seeded and unseeded pots. A seeded team was drawn against an unseeded team, with the order of legs in each tie decided by draw. Due to the limited time between matches, the draws for the second and third qualifying rounds took place before the results of the previous round were known. For these draws (or in any cases where the result of a tie in the previous round was not known at the time of the draw), the seeding was carried out under the assumption that the team with the higher coefficient of an undecided tie advanced to this round, which means if the team with the lower coefficient was to advance, it simply took the seeding of its defeated opponent. Prior to the draws, UEFA formed "groups" in accordance with the principles set by the Club Competitions Committee, but they were purely for convenience of the draw and for ensuring that teams from the same association were not drawn against each other, and did not resemble any real groupings in the sense of the competition.

Seeding
A total of 44 teams played in the play-off round: the 29 winners of the third qualifying round, and the 15 losers of the Champions League third qualifying round. The draw was held on 7 August 2015. (Note: The numbers for each team were pre-assigned by UEFA so that the draw could be held in one run for all groups with 10 teams and another run for all groups with 12 teams.)

Notes

Summary
The first legs were played on 20 August, and the second legs were played on 27 August 2015.

|}

Notes

Matches

Belenenses won 1–0 on aggregate.

3–3 on aggregate. Athletic Bilbao won on away goals.

Rosenborg won 3–1 on aggregate.

Legia Warsaw won 4–2 on aggregate.

Viktoria Plzeň won 5–0 on aggregate.

Saint-Étienne won 2–1 on aggregate.

Ajax won 1–0 on aggregate.

Qarabağ won 4–0 on aggregate.

3–3 on aggregate. Molde won on away goals.

PAOK won 6–1 on aggregate.

2–2 on aggregate. Bordeaux won on away goals.

Lech Poznań won 4–0 on aggregate.

2–2 on aggregate. Dinamo Minsk won 3–2 on penalties.

Rubin Kazan won 2–1 on aggregate.

Slovan Liberec won 2–0 on aggregate.

Fenerbahçe won 4–0 on aggregate.

2–2 on aggregate. Gabala won on away goals.

Midtjylland won 2–1 on aggregate.

AZ won 4–3 on aggregate.

Borussia Dortmund won 11–5 on aggregate.

Krasnodar won 5–1 on aggregate.

Sparta Prague won 6–4 on aggregate.

Notes

References

External links
2015–16 UEFA Europa League

2
June 2015 sports events in Europe
July 2015 sports events in Europe
August 2015 sports events in Europe
UEFA Europa League qualifying rounds